Žeravé znamenie osudu (which translates to The Blazing Sign of Destiny) is the third studio album by Slovak rock band Tublatanka, which was released in 1988, by Opus Records. It contains the hit singles "Láska, drž ma nad hladinou" and "Pravda víťazí" (the latter which became the anthem for the Velvet Revolution). "Pravda víťazí" is featured in the 2005 horror film Hostel, directed by Eli Roth.

Track listing 
Source: Official website

Credits 
BAND
Maťo Ďurinda – lead vocals, guitars, piano
Palo Horváth – bass guitar, backing vocals, lead vocals on "Stojím, padám", "Prometeus" and pre-chorus of "Pravda víťazí"
Ďuro Černý – drums, percussion

References 

1988 albums
Tublatanka albums